Olongapo City National High School is one of the biggest school in Olongapo City. It has an average population of 5,530 students. The main campus located in the central part of Olongapo City along Rizal Avenue, corner 14th Street, East Tapinac with a total service area of 18,993 square meters. It is more than 2.43 kilometers away from the Department of Education (DepEd) Division Office, Olongapo City to the main campus.

History
Olongapo City National High School traces its humble beginning as a Reservation High School established on June 3, 1946, back when the municipality of Olongapo was still under the United States Reservation Administration. The time when Filipinos were at the height of rehabilitation from World War II. It started as the Reservation High School with an initial enrollment of 320 students under the United States (US) Naval Reservation Administration.  For sometime, it was called JK Jackson High School in honor of US Reservation Commander, Captain JK Jackson who during the time of its establishment was the senior officer in charge.

Later on, it was called Olongapo High School but was still under the administration of the US Naval Reservation. As the municipality of Olongapo was populated and flourished due to economic activities brought by the expansion of the US Ship Repair Facility (SRF) and other port and military services during Korean War, the demand to turn over the town to Zambales Provincial government for added provincial revenues became stronger.  Under the United States- Republic of the Philippines Military Base Agreement of 1954, the municipality and Olongapo High School were officially turned over to the provincial government in 1959.

On June 1, 1966, the school was renamed Olongapo City High School upon the passage of Republic Act 4645 - the law converting the municipality of Olongapo into a chartered city. The school was once again renamed as Olongapo City National High School in September 1972 and carries the same name to the present.

It offers various curricula for high school students designed to develop individual learning inclinations and interests, discover talent in journalism, creative arts, to learn foreign languages and stress discipline in the field of sports as well as physical sciences. It also opens its doors to non-conventional educational programs such as distance and special educations.

Principal

See also
 Regional Science High School III
 Kalalake National High School
 James L. Gordon Integrated School

References

Science high schools in the Philippines
High schools in Zambales
Schools in Olongapo
Educational institutions established in 1946
1946 establishments in the Philippines